Since the AFC Asian Cup was founded in 1956, Qatar has participated in 10 Asian Cups between 1980 and 2019. However, prior to the 2019 edition, Qatar only reached the quarter-finals twice: in 2000 as one of the two best third-place teams when the tournament had only 12 nations competing, and in 2011, when they finished second in Group A behind Uzbekistan.

In the 2019 AFC Asian Cup, Qatar, who was the first team to qualify aside from hosts United Arab Emirates, exceeded expectations. Before 2019, Qatar last won a game outside Qatar in the Asian Cup in 1984, when Singapore hosted the tournament. In 2019, Qatar won its first six games, as many games as they had won in the previous nine editions, and conceded zero goals. Defeating Japan in the final to win the 2019 Asian Cup has become Qatar's greatest achievement to date, compared to several Gulf rivals like the United Arab Emirates, Saudi Arabia, Bahrain, Kuwait and Iraq. Qatar has hosted the tournament twice, in 1988 and 2011. The 2011 edition was seen as a step for Qatar in perpetration for the 2022 FIFA World Cup in the country, while ironically, Qatar was the only nation to submit their bid for it.

Record

1980 edition

Group B

1984 edition

Group A

1988 edition

Group A

1992 edition

Group B

2000 edition

Group C

Quarter-finals

2004 edition

Group A

2007 edition

Group B

2011 edition

Group A

Quarter-finals

2015 edition

Group C

2019 edition

Group E

Round of 16

Quarter-finals

Semi-finals

Final

References

 
Countries at the AFC Asian Cup